Juan Pablo Garat (born 19 April 1983 in Buenos Aires) is an Argentine former footballer.
Garat started his playing career in 2004 with Atlanta. He joined St. Gallen in 2005.

On 15 June 2010, Juan Pablo Garat signed for Dinamo București. He left Dinamo and joined Aarau in the summer of 2011.

Honours
St. Gallen
 Swiss Challenge League: 2008–09
Aarau
 Swiss Challenge League: 2012–13

References

External links
 
 Player profile 
 
 Juan Pablo Garat – Primera División statisticsat Fútbol XXI  
 

1983 births
Living people
Footballers from Buenos Aires
Argentine footballers
Argentine expatriate footballers
Club Atlético Atlanta footballers
FC St. Gallen players
FC Aarau players
FC Baden players
Club Atlético Tigre footballers
FC Dinamo București players
Swiss Super League players
Swiss Challenge League players
Liga I players
Expatriate footballers in Switzerland
Expatriate footballers in Romania
Argentine expatriate sportspeople in Romania
Argentine expatriate sportspeople in Switzerland
Association football defenders